The Last Trail is a 1927 American silent Western film directed by Lewis Seiler and written by John Stone. It is based on the 1909 novel The Last Trail by Zane Grey. The film stars Tom Mix, Carmelita Geraghty, William B. Davidson, Jerry Madden, Frank Hagney and Lee Shumway. The film was released on January 23, 1927, by Fox Film Corporation.

Cast   
 Tom Mix as Tom Dane
 Carmelita Geraghty as Nita Carrol
 William B. Davidson as Kurt Morley 
 Jerry Madden as Tommy Pascal
 Frank Hagney as Henchman Cal Barker
 Lee Shumway as Sheriff Joe Pascal
 Robert Brower as Sam Beasley
 Oliver Eckhardt as Jasper Carrol
 Frank Beal as Bert Summers
 Tony the Horse as Tony

References

External links
 

1927 films
1927 Western (genre) films
Fox Film films
Films directed by Lewis Seiler
American black-and-white films
Silent American Western (genre) films
1920s English-language films
1920s American films